This is the complete list of Commonwealth Games medallists in boxing from 1930 to 2014.

Men's

Light flyweight

Flyweight

Bantamweight

Featherweight

Lightweight

Light welterweight

Welterweight

Light middleweight

Middleweight

Light heavyweight

Heavyweight

Super heavyweight

Women's

Flyweight

Lightweight

Middleweight

References
Results Database from the Commonwealth Games Federation

Boxing
Medalists

Commonwealth Games